Helicarion mastersi is a species of air-breathing land snail, also referred to as a semi-slug because of its small shell. It is a terrestrial pulmonate gastropod mollusc in the family Helicarionidae.

The specific name mastersi is in honor of the Australian malacologist George Masters (1837-1912), who collected the type specimen.

Subspecies 
Subspecies include:
 Helicarion mastersi callidus Iredale, 1941
 Helicarion mastersi mastersi (Cox, 1868)

Distribution 
This species is found in New South Wales, Australia.

The type locality is Kiama, New South Wales, Australia.

Description 
Helicarion mastersi was originally described (under the name Vitrina mastersi) by James Charles Cox in 1868.  Cox's original text (the type description) reads as follows:

Ecology 
This semislug lives in closed Eucalyptus forests.  It is primarily an arboreal species, but it can also be found in leaf litter.

References
This article incorporates public domain text from the reference

External links 

 "Species Helicarion mastersi (Cox, 1868)". Australian Faunal Directory, accessed 18 September 2011.

Helicarionidae
Gastropods described in 1868
Taxa named by James Charles Cox